The 1993–94 Ohio Bobcats men's basketball team represented Ohio University as a member of the Mid-American Conference in the college basketball season of 1993–94. The team was coached by Larry Hunter and played their home games at the Convocation Center. The Bobcats won the Big Island Invitational tournament, MAC regular season and conference tournament titles, and received an automatic bid to the NCAA tournament. Ohio finished with a record of 25–8 (14–4 MAC).

Roster

Schedule and results

|-
!colspan=9 style=| Non-conference regular season

|-
!colspan=9 style=| MAC Regular Season

|-
!colspan=9 style=| MAC Tournament

|-
!colspan=9 style=| NCAA Tournament

Statistics

Team Statistics
Final 1993–94 Statistics

Source

Player statistics

Source

Awards and honors
Gary Trent – MAC Player of the Year (2x)

References

External links
Final 1994 Division I Men's Basketball Statistics Report
Ohio Record Book

Ohio Bobcats men's basketball seasons
Ohio
Ohio
Ohio Bobcats men's basketball
Ohio Bobcats men's basketball